Cenocoelius huggerti is a species of hymenopteran insect belonging to the family Braconidae. It is only known from a single female collected from Bakau in Gambia in 1978. It is the only known member of the subfamily Cenocoeliinae from the Afrotropical realm. This generally dark insect has a body length of 4.9 mm. The species is named after the collector of the only specimen, the late Lars Huggert.

References

Braconidae
Insects described in 2005